Reventino is a massif in the southern Apennines, in Calabria, southern Italy. It marks the narrowest point of the Italian peninsula, being at the top of the Isthmus of Catanzaro that separates the Ionian and Tyrrhenian Seas.

The massif is bordered by the Savuto river valley from the north, the Sant'Eufemia Plain southwards, and the Tyrrhenian Sea and the Sila Piccola sub-range. The maximum elevation is included in the territory of Platania

Sources

External links 
 Website of the Reventino Mountain Community 

Mountains of Calabria